The 1987–88 UEFA Cup was won by Bayer Leverkusen on penalty kicks over Español.

It was the third season of English clubs being barred from this and indeed all European competitions as the sequel of the Heysel disaster of May 1985. The English clubs who missed out on this season of the UEFA Cup were Liverpool, Tottenham Hotspur and Arsenal.

Soviet Union gained a fourth place, Austria and Romania a third one, while France, East Germany and Czechoslovakia remained with two places.

First round

|}

First leg

Second leg

Internazionale won 3–1 on aggregate.

Aberdeen won 1–0 on aggregate.

Español won 5–1 on aggregate.

Brøndby won 2–1 on aggregate.

Budapesti Honvéd won 1–0 on aggregate.

Borussia Dortmund won 3–2 on aggregate.

Dundee United won 4–1 on aggregate.

Victoria București won 4–0 on aggregate.

Barcelona won 2–1 on aggregate.

1–1 on aggregate; Wismut Aue won on away goals.

Spartak Moscow won 3–1 on aggregate.

4–4 on aggregate; Chaves won on away goals.

TJ Vítkovice won 3–1 on aggregate.

Club Brugge won 5–2 on aggregate.

Feyenoord won 10–2 on aggregate.

Bayer Leverkusen won 5–1 on aggregate.

Dynamo Moscow won 5–0 on aggregate.

Beveren won 2–1 on aggregate.

Flamurtari won 3–2 on aggregate.

Utrecht won 2–0 on aggregate.

Werder Bremen won 5–1 on aggregate.

Panathinaikos won 4–3 on aggregate.

Dinamo Tbilisi won 4–3 on aggregate.

Hellas Verona won 4–2 on aggregate.

Crvena Zvezda won 5–2 on aggregate.

Milan won 3–1 on aggregate.
The game was played in Lecce because of the ban on San Siro.

Sportul Studențesc won 3–1 on aggregate.

Vitória de Guimarães won 2–1 on aggregate.

Toulouse won 6–1 on aggregate.

TPS won 2–1 on aggregate.

Juventus won 7–0 on aggregate.

Velež Mostar won 5–3 on aggregate.

Second round

|}

First leg

Second leg

Werder Bremen won 7–6 on aggregate.

Español won 2–0 on aggregate.

2–2 on aggregate; Feyenoord won on away goals.

Borussia Dortmund won 3–2 on aggregate.

3–3 on aggregate; Sportul Studențesc won 3–0 on penalties.

Budapesti Honvéd won 5–2 on aggregate.

TJ Vítkovice won 3–2 on aggregate.

Verona won 3–2 on aggregate.

Barcelona won 2–0 on aggregate.

Flamurtari won 2–1 on aggregate.

Internazionale won 2–1 on aggregate.

3–3 on aggregate; Panathinaikos won on away goals.

Club Brugge won 5–3 on aggregate.

Bayer Leverkusen won 2–1 on aggregate.

Dinamo Tbilisi won 2–1 on aggregate.

1–1 on aggregate; Vitória de Guimarães won 5–4 on penalties.

Third round

|}

First leg

Second leg

Club Brugge won 5–3 on aggregate.

Panathinaikos won 7–6 on aggregate.

Barcelona won 4–2 on aggregate.

Bayer Leverkusen won 3–2 on aggregate.

Hellas Verona won 4–1 on aggregate.

Español won 2–1 on aggregate.

2–2 on aggregate; TJ Vítkovice won 5–4 on penalties.

Werder Bremen won 3–2 on aggregate.

Quarter-finals

|}

First leg

Second leg

Bayer Leverkusen won 1–0 on aggregate.

Werder Bremen won 2–1 on aggregate.

Club Brugge won 3–2 on aggregate.

Español won 2–0 on aggregate.

Semi-finals

|}

First leg

Second leg

Bayer Leverkusen won 1–0 on aggregate.

Español won 3–2 on aggregate.

Final

First leg

Second leg

3–3 on aggregate; Bayer Leverkusen won 3–2 on penalties.

Notes

External links
1987–88 All matches UEFA Cup – season at UEFA website
Official Site
Results at RSSSF.com
 All scorers 1987–88 UEFA Cup according to protocols UEFA
1987/88 UEFA Cup - results and line-ups (archive)

UEFA Cup seasons
2